George Townes Rison (February 3, 1850 – January 28, 1929) was an American Democratic politician who served as a member of the Virginia Senate. He resigned before the end of his fifth term in 1923.

References

External links

1850 births
1929 deaths
Democratic Party Virginia state senators
20th-century American politicians
Politicians from Danville, Virginia
University of Virginia alumni